Renato Corsetti (born 29 March 1941) is an Italian Esperantist who served as President of the Universal Esperanto Association between 2001 and 2007. Born in Rome, Corsetti is a staunch defender of the idea that the people of the world should be able to communicate in a neutral and easy international language. He teaches psycholinguistics at the Sapienza University of Rome. He also is an associate professor at the International Academy of Sciences San Marino.

He is married to Anna Löwenstein, an Esperantist (elected in December 2019). The couple lived together in Italy from 1981, but since 2015 they have been living in the UK.

References

External links
 His page at La Sapienza

Akademio de Esperanto members
1941 births
Italian Esperantists
Living people
Academic staff of the Sapienza University of Rome